P'aquchi (Aymara) is a Bolivian folk dance. It is a satire of the fencing of the Spaniards during the colonial period.

References 

Bolivian dances
Native American dances
La Paz Department (Bolivia)